Rev. Samuel Weed Barnum (June 4, 1820 – November 18, 1891) was an American minister and author.

Barnum, the only son of Horace and Cynthia (Weed) Barnum, was born in North Salem, Westchester County, New York, on June 4, 1820, and removed to Stamford, Connecticut, in 1835.

Barnum graduated from Yale College in 1841.  He studied in the Yale Divinity School from 1841 to 1844, but during his theological course, and afterwards, he suffered much from ill-health. From March, 1845, to August, 1847, he was the principal assistant of Professor Goodrich in the revision of Webster's Dictionary.

From December, 1848, to April, 1850, he preached to the First Congregational Church in Granby, Connecticut.  In 1851-2 he preached for fourteen months at Feeding Hills, then a parish of West Springfield, now of Agawam, Massachusetts. He was ordained pastor of the Congregational Church in Chesterfield, Mass., on January 25, 1853, and remained there for two years. From January 1, 1856, to May 14, 1862, he was pastor of the church in Phillipston, Mass. He remained for one year longer in Phillipston, and then resided for two years in Stamford.

In May, 1865, he removed to New Haven, and during his residence here, besides preaching as health and opportunity permitted, he prepared for the press a Comprehensive Dictionary of the Bible (1868), mainly abridged from Dr. William Smith; Romanism as it is (1871); and a Vocabulary of English Rhymes (1876). His health, never robust, was after this date more precarious; but he was able to take charge, in part, of the department of pronunciation in the new Webster's International Dictionary (1890), and was preparing an elaborate Fifty-years' Record of his Yale class, when his death occurred, very suddenly, from heart-disease, in New Haven, on November 18, 1891, in his 72nd year.

He married, on April 16, 1849, Charlotte Betts, of Stamford, who survived him with their children, two sons and two daughters ; the sons are graduates of Yale College, in 1875 and 1879, respectively, one daughter was mathematician Charlotte Barnum.

External links
 

1820 births
1891 deaths
People from North Salem, New York
Yale Divinity School alumni
American lexicographers
American Congregationalist ministers
American male non-fiction writers
American religious writers
Yale College alumni
19th-century American clergy
19th-century lexicographers